Flameau du Centre is a professional football club based in Gitega, Burundi. The team currently plays in the Burundi Ligue A, the top division of Burundi football.

History 
The club comes from the Le Messager FC academy, like the Le Messager Football Club Ngozi, it evolved at the beginning under the name Académie Le Messager FC Gitega before taking the name of Flambeau du Center . The Messenger Gitega was able to access the 2nd national division after three years of negotiations for name change  reasons. The leaders of the federation could not accept two teams with the same name of Messenger .

Since the 2017–2018 season, the club has played in the first division of Burundi. In 2022 the club won its first league title.

Honors

National competitions 
 Burundi Championship (1) 
 Champions: 2021–22 
 Burundi Cup (0) 
 Winner: —
 Finalist: 2021, 2022

Current team

References

External links
Soccerway

Football clubs in Burundi